Dicerca hornii is a species of metallic wood-boring beetle in the family Buprestidae. It is found in North America.

Subspecies
These three subspecies belong to the species Dicerca hornii:
 Dicerca horni ampliata Casey
 Dicerca hornii hornii Crotch, 1873
 Dicerca hornii nelsoni Beer, 1974

References

Further reading

 
 
 

Buprestidae
Beetles of North America
Beetles described in 1873
Taxa named by George Robert Crotch
Articles created by Qbugbot